Jesus Santiago Duran (July 26, 1948 – February 17, 1977) was a U.S. Army veteran of the Vietnam War, and a recipient of the Medal of Honor.

Biography
Duran was born, July 26, 1948, in Juarez, Mexico. He was the sixth of twelve siblings.

Duran joined the U.S. Army on May 13, 1968, and was assigned to Company E, 2nd Battalion, 5th Cavalry, 1st Cavalry Division (Airmobile) to support Search and Destroy missions. During his service in the Vietnam war, his actions resulted in him being awarded, posthumously in 2014, the Medal of Honor.

After leaving the military, Duran pursued a career as a corrections officer at a juvenile detention center in San Bernardino, California, dedicating personal time to mentoring youths and leading them on educational trips. He married twice and had two children. Duran died on February 17, 1977, and is buried at Olivewood Memorial Park in Riverside, California.

Medal of Honor
Duran's daughter, Tina Duran-Ruvalcaba, received the Medal of Honor on his behalf from President Barack Obama in a March 18, 2014 White House ceremony. The following day, she received the Medal of Honor flag from Secretary of Defense, Chuck Hagel, in a ceremony where Duran was inducted into the Pentagon Hall of Heroes.

The award came through the Defense Authorization Act which called for a review of Jewish American and Hispanic American veterans from World War II, the Korean War and the Vietnam War to ensure that no prejudice was shown to those deserving the Medal of Honor.

Citation

Commendations
SGT Duran's awards included the following:

See also

 List of Medal of Honor recipients for the Vietnam War
 Hispanic Medal of Honor recipients
 Ysmael R. Villegas, also a Medal of Honor recipient from Riverside
 Salvador J. Lara, also a Medal of Honor recipient from Riverside

References

External links
 

1948 births
1977 deaths
Burials at Olivewood Memorial Park
Foreign-born Medal of Honor recipients
Hispanic and Latino American people
Mexican emigrants to the United States
People from Riverside, California
Recipients of the Air Medal
United States Army Medal of Honor recipients
Vietnam War recipients of the Medal of Honor
United States Army personnel of the Vietnam War